Sugar Creek is an unincorporated community in Moral Township, Shelby County, in the U.S. state of Indiana.

The community took its name from Sugar Creek, which flows southward in the area just west of the community.

Geography

Climate
The climate in this area is characterized by hot, humid summers and generally mild to cool winters. According to the Köppen Climate Classification system, Sugar Creek has a humid subtropical climate, abbreviated "Cfa" on climate maps.

References

Unincorporated communities in Indiana
Unincorporated communities in Shelby County, Indiana
Indianapolis metropolitan area